Monomorium talbotae is a species of ant in the genus Monomorium. It is native to the United States. It is named after entomologist Mary Talbot.

References

External links

Insects of the United States
talbotae
Hymenoptera of North America
Insects described in 1981
Taxonomy articles created by Polbot